Tony Spredeman (born September 19, 1984) is an American master table football player from Milwaukee, WI, USA currently living in Florida. He is a multiple-time World Champion and often partners with Billy Pappas in the Open Doubles format.

He has won several World Championships - including the Tornado Worlds 2008. Tony finished 2nd at the ITSF World Championships in early 2009 which is a multi-table tournament. Many people consider Tony to be among the best table foosball players in the world, at least on the Tornado table.

In April 2010, Tony Spredeman became the global spokesperson for the Fireball table.

Spredeman believes the games are tougher today.

See also
 List of world table football champions

References

External links
Profile at tablesoccer.org
Profile at insidefoos.com
Profile at FoosWorld.com

Living people
Sportspeople from Milwaukee
1984 births
Table football
World champions in table football